Jared Gladwyn Butler (born August 25, 2000) is an American professional basketball player for the Oklahoma City Thunder of the National Basketball Association (NBA), on a two-way contract with the Oklahoma City Blue of the NBA G League. He played college basketball for the Baylor Bears. As a junior in 2021, he was named a consensus first-team All-American and helped lead the Bears to a national championship. Butler was named the Final Four Most Outstanding Player (MOP).

Early life and high school career
Butler is the son of Richard and Juanea Butler. By the time he was eleven years old, he was competing in out-of-state basketball tournaments. Butler grew up in Reserve, Louisiana and attended Riverside Academy, where he joined the school's varsity basketball team as an eighth grader. As a junior, he averaged 20.4 points and 6.7 assists and was named first team all-state. Butler averaged 27.4 points, 8.8 rebounds, 8.4 assists and 3.0 steals during his senior season and was again named first team All-State as well as Player of the Year by The Times-Picayune. Rated a four-star prospect, Butler committed to play college basketball at Alabama over offers from Virginia and Baylor. He picked the Crimson Tide because he was confused why Baylor was not recruiting him harder despite his coach Tim Byrd being friends with Bears coach Scott Drew; the Bears were short on scholarships and long on guards.

College career
Butler enrolled at Alabama, but did not participate in the team's summer workouts and requested an unconditional release from his letter of intent in order to transfer to Baylor University. Alabama released him from his commitment in August. A scholarship had opened up at Baylor due to the early retirement of Jake Lindsey.

Butler was eligible to play immediately after transferring due to his release. He averaged 10.2 points, 3.1 rebounds and 2.7 assists as a true freshman and was named honorable mention All-Big 12 Conference and to the league's All-Freshman team. Butler was named the Big 12 Newcomer of the Week on February 25, 2019 after averaging 14.5 points, 4.5 assists and 4.0 rebounds in conference games against Iowa State and West Virginia.

Butler was named the 98th-best collegiate basketball player going into the 2019–20 season by CBS Sports. On November 5, 2019, Butler scored 30 points and made a career-high eight three-pointers in a 105–61 win over Central Arkansas. He was named the MVP of the 2019 Myrtle Beach Invitational and the Big 12 Player of the Week after averaging 17.7 points, 3.7 assists and 2.7 steals over three games as the Bears won the tournament. On January 11, 2020, Butler scored 22 points as Baylor defeated Kansas for its first win ever at the Phog Allen Fieldhouse. As a result, he earned his second Big 12 Player of the Week honors on January 13. On February 3, he was added to the revised 20-man Wooden Award watchlist and was named one of ten finalists for the Bob Cousy Award. At the conclusion of the regular season, Butler was named First Team All-Big 12 and a third-team All-American by the Associated Press, USBWA, NABC and Sporting News after averaging 16.0 points, 3.2 rebounds, 3.1 assists and 1.6 steals per game. Following the season, Butler declared for the 2020 NBA draft. On August 3, he announced he was withdrawing from the draft and returning to Baylor.

Coming into his junior season, Butler was named Preseason Big 12 player of the year. On January 18, 2021, he recorded a season-high 30 points and eight assists in a 77–69 win against Kansas. Butler was a unanimous First Team All-Big 12 selection and earned consensus first-team All-American honors. He led Baylor to its first national championship, and was named NCAA tournament Most Outstanding Player after posting 22 points and seven assists in an 86–70 win over previously undefeated Gonzaga in the title game. As a junior, Butler averaged 16.7 points, 4.8 assists and 3.3 rebounds per game. On May 30, he declared for the 2021 NBA draft, forgoing his remaining college eligibility.

Professional career

Utah Jazz (2021–2022)
On June 22, 2021, Butler was referred to a fitness-to-play panel by the NBA and was not permitted to play or practice in the league. On July 17, he was medically cleared to play in the NBA. On July 29, Butler was selected in the second round of the 2021 NBA draft with the 40th overall pick by the New Orleans Pelicans, but was traded to the Utah Jazz via the Memphis Grizzlies. On August 12, he signed his rookie scale contract with the Jazz. On March 18, 2022, Butler recorded a career-high 21 points, alongside seven assists, in a 121–92 win over the Los Angeles Clippers.

On October 15, 2022, Butler was waived by the Jazz.

Grand Rapids Gold (2022–2023)
On November 4, 2022, Butler was named to the opening night roster for the Grand Rapids Gold.

Oklahoma City Thunder / Blue (2023–present)
On March 3, 2023, Butler signed a two-way contract with the Oklahoma City Thunder.

Career statistics

NBA

Regular season

|-
| style="text-align:left;"| 
| style="text-align:left;"| Utah
| 42 || 1 || 8.6 || .404 || .318 || .688 || 1.1 || 1.5 || .4 || .2 || 3.8
|- class="sortbottom"
| style="text-align:center;" colspan="2"| Career
| 42 || 1 || 8.6 || .404 || .318 || .688 || 1.1 || 1.5 || .4 || .2 || 3.8

Playoffs

|-
| style="text-align:left;"| 2022
| style="text-align:left;"| Utah
| 1 || 0 || 5.0 || .000 || — || — || 1.0 || .0 || .0 || .0 || .0
|- class="sortbottom"
| style="text-align:center;" colspan="2"|Career
| 1 || 0 || 5.0 || .000 || — || — || 1.0 || .0 || .0 || .0 || .0

College

|-
| style="text-align:left;"| 2018–19
| style="text-align:left;"| Baylor
| 34 || 21 || 26.8 || .395 || .351 || .794 || 3.1 || 2.7 || 1.0 || .1 || 10.2
|-
| style="text-align:left;"| 2019–20
| style="text-align:left;"| Baylor
| 30 || 30 || 30.4 || .421 || .381 || .775 || 3.2 || 3.1 || 1.6 || .1 || 16.0
|-
| style="text-align:left;"| 2020–21
| style="text-align:left;"| Baylor
| 30 || 30 || 30.3 || .471 || .416 || .780 || 3.3 || 4.8 || 2.0 || .4 || 16.7
|- class="sortbottom"
| style="text-align:center;" colspan="2"| Career
| 94 || 81 || 29.1 || .431 || .384 || .782 || 3.2 || 3.5 || 1.5 || .2 || 14.1

References

External links

Baylor Bears bio
USA Basketball bio

2000 births
Living people
All-American college men's basketball players
American men's basketball players
Basketball players from Louisiana
Baylor Bears men's basketball players
New Orleans Pelicans draft picks
Oklahoma City Blue players
Oklahoma City Thunder players
People from Reserve, Louisiana
Point guards
Salt Lake City Stars players
Utah Jazz players